Changfeng Park (literally: Park of Far Off Wind) is a landscaped park in the west of Shanghai, China. The size of the park is 364,000 square meters. It features an artificial lake, Yinchu Lake, and an artificial hill, Tiebi Hill. There are various facilities including a Sea Life aquarium and boating on the lake.

Location
The park is located in the Putuo District. To the east is East China Normal University.

History
The first phase of constructing the park started on 4 April 1957 and the second phase started in July 1958. The park was opened on Chinese National Day (1 October) in 1959. Initially the park was called Huxi Park ("Western Shanghai Park") and then Biluohu Park ("Green Usnea Lake Park") when it was partly opened on 1 July 1958. On 29 September 1959, the deputy secretary of the Shanghai Municipal Party Committee, Wei Wenbo, changed its name to Changfeng Park ("Park of Far Off Wind"). He also named the artificial lake and hill as Yin Chu Lake ("Gleaming Mattock Lake") and Tie Bi Hill ("Mighty Arm Hill"). Both names were adopted from a Mao Zedong's poem written in 1958.

Changfeng Ocean World (Sea Life Shanghai)

Changfeng Ocean World, also known as Sea Life Shanghai is the main attraction within Changfeng Park. It opened in 1999 with an area of 10,000 square meters. It showcases more than 10,000 marine creatures of over 300 different varieties. It is China's first marine aquarium, and Shanghai's first large-scale world-class aquarium. There are more than 1,500 species of marine life on display, and it is one of Shanghai's youth science education bases. The main building is located 13 metres below Yin Chu Lake. The aquarium was purchased by Merlin Entertainments in 2012.

Changfeng Ocean World controversially includes a beluga whale and sea lion performance hall. Visitors can, in cooperation with the staff, wear diving suits dance in the water with the whales or sea lions. It is believed that for this reason, Changfeng Ocean World is not linked to from the main Sea Life website.

Transportation
The park can be reached by taking Shanghai Metro Line 3 or Line 4 to the Jinshajiang Road Station to the northeast of the park. Shanghai Metro Line 2 runs south of the park.

Gallery

See also
Zhongshan Park, to the southeast

References

External links

 Changfeng Ocean World official website

1959 establishments in China
Parks in Shanghai
Urban public parks
Lakes of China
Artificial lakes of China
Boating lakes
Aquaria in China
Sea Life Centres